Scarisbrick, also found as Scarsbrick, Scarsbrook, Scaysbrook, Scarasbrick and Scarrisbrick, is a toponymic surname of English origin, derived from the parish of Scarisbrick in Lancashire.

It may refer to:

People named Scarisbrick
Andy Scarisbrick, former in-concert guitarist of British music group The Overlanders
Jack Scarisbrick (born 1928), English historian
John Scarisbrick, photographer and former singer of Swedish death metal band Morbid

Neil Scarisbrick (born 1970), British bobsledder
Sir Thomas Scarisbrick, 1st Baronet (1874–1933), British politician
William Benedict Scarisbrick, former Roman Catholic Bishop of Port-Louis and Titular Archbishop of Cyzicus
John Plessington (c. 1637 – 1679), also known as William Scarisbrick, English saint

People named Scarsbrook
Louie McCarthy-Scarsbrook (born 1986), English rugby league player
Stanley Scarsbrook (born 1908), English athlete

People named Scaysbrook
James Scaysbrook (born 1982), English rugby union player

See also
Scarisbrick baronets
Michael Hastings, Baron Hastings of Scarisbrick

English toponymic surnames